Viener is a surname. Notable people with the surname include:

John Viener (born 1972), American actor, comedian, and writer
Harry Viener (1868–1947), English military chaplain

See also
Vener
Viner